A by-election was held for the British House of Commons constituency of Dudley West on 15 December 1994 following the death of the sitting Conservative Member of Parliament (MP) John Blackburn.

The result was a Labour gain from the Conservatives, on one of the largest swings since the Second World War. This was the first significant sign of the changed political climate following the election of Tony Blair as Labour leader, which would eventually lead to Labour's 1997 general election victory. Labour gained nearly 70% of the votes, whereas the Conservative candidate attracted fewer than 20% of the votes.

Result

Previous result

See also
Lists of United Kingdom by-elections

References

Dudley West by-election, BBC News

Dudley West by-election
Dudley West by-election
Politics of Dudley
By-elections to the Parliament of the United Kingdom in West Midlands (county) constituencies
1990s in the West Midlands (county)
Dudley West by-election